London Academy (formerly Edgware School) is a mixed all-through school and sixth form for pupils ages 4 to 18. It is located in Edgware in the London Borough of Barnet, England.

History
Formerly "Edgware School", it opened as the London Academy on 1 September 2004. The London Academy was one of 5 DfES Academies opened in 2004. Academies are all-ability schools established with sponsorship from business, faith or voluntary groups. The first 3 opened in 2002, and 9 more in 2003. Sponsorship of £1.5 million was provided by the chairman of a venture capital company, Peter Shalson. Money was also raised by resale of part of the old site.

On 18 May 2006, pupil Kiyan Prince was stabbed and killed outside of the school gates following an altercation with a fellow student.

The process of finalising a new school building with full occupancy was completed on schedule in September 2006.

The school experienced rapidly rising grades in the years after conversion to an academy: In 2005 the school achieved the best results ever with 49% A*-C grades at GCSE. In 2006 this rose to 56% and 78% in 2008.

In 2016, construction started for a new primary school on-site, which will make it a 4-18 all-through school.

London Academy was graded as good in the latest Ofsted report published in 6 June 2018.

Subjects

Key Stage 3
English
Mathematics
Science (Biology, Chemistry, Physics)
Computer Science
Design and Technology
Religious Studies
Geography
History
Art
Music
Dance and Drama
Physical Education (PE)
PSCHE (Personal, Social Citizenship and Health Education)
Languages (Spanish & French)

Key Stage 4
English
Mathematics
Science (Double or Triple)
French or Spanish (exceptions for certain individuals)
Religious Studies (exceptions for certain individuals)
PE (compulsory for non GCSE exam students)
PSCHE (Personal, Social, Citizenship & Health Education)
Geography or History (Or Both if chosen)

Notable former pupils
Kiyan Prince (Professional footballer)

References

External links
London Academy official website

Secondary schools in the London Borough of Barnet
Edgware
Academies in the London Borough of Barnet
Primary schools in the London Borough of Barnet
Educational institutions established in 2004
2004 establishments in England